The Presbyterian Church in Korea (HoHun II) is a Presbyterian denomination in Korea. It adheres to the Westminster Confession and the Apostles Creed. In 2004 it had 8850 members in 73 congregations and 79 ordained clergy.

References 

Presbyterian denominations in South Korea
Presbyterian denominations in Asia